James Michael Papantonio (born October 24, 1953) is an American torts lawyer, television presenter, radio talk show host and writer. He has been inducted into the Trial Lawyer Hall of Fame.

As a professional trial lawyer, Papantonio co-hosts Ring of Fire, a nationally syndicated progressive weekly radio program, with Sam Seder, where he is referenced as America's Lawyer. In December 2016, Papantonio began hosting a program on YouTube called America's Lawyer.

Biography
Papantonio graduated from the University of Florida and received his J.D. from Cumberland School of Law. He was admitted to The Florida Bar in 1982 and the bar of the United States District Court for the Middle District of Florida in 1983. He graduated from DeSoto County High School, Arcadia, Florida. 

Papantonio is a senior partner in the Pensacola, Florida-based Levin Papantonio Law Firm, a leading mass torts firm. Within the lawyer community, Mike Papantonio is known for his work in mass torts, product liability, personal injury, and wrongful death cases, and has returned numerous verdicts of multi-million dollar damages.

He has been listed in Best Lawyers in America since 1999, and has written several books, including the legal thriller Law and Disorder; Resurrecting Aesop: Fables Lawyers Should Remember; Clarence Darrow, the Journeyman; and In Search of Atticus Finch, A Motivational Book for Lawyers, as well as Defenses You Can Count on in an Asbestosis Case and How to Prove a Sick Building Case. He also co-authored Closing Arguments–The Last Battle with Fred Levin.

Papantonio says he wrote In Search of Atticus Finch as a "wake-up call to the legal profession that has largely lost its moral compass" and has said that "seventy percent of kids coming out of law school want to represent corporations and get paid exorbitant amounts of money," he says. "They're willing to sell their souls to the highest bidder. 

We need to bring more quality to what we do as lawyers, we need to be better servants to the community and we need to have more political involvement for positive change in the country."  In 2004, Papantonio helped launch a nationwide organization called Mass Torts Made Perfect. 

This organization holds annual conferences for the top personal injury attorneys and teaches them successful litigation strategies to use against multi-national corporations. 

America's Lawyer airs weekly on Thursdays from 3pm ET. EST. On the weekly show Papantonio, a Methodist, often criticizes the Christian right. He has said that "I come from a pretty strong spiritual center, but it doesn't change the way I judge people. Simply put, the Sermon on the Mount makes much more sense to me than the frenzied rantings of America's new 'religious right'. 

They have become an element of American politics that threatens our sense of decency as well as our democracy." His role on Ring of Fire was featured in the 2006 documentary Jesus Camp, in which he offers commentary on many of the scenes depicted. According to DVD commentary by the film's directors, Papantonio was added to the film later on because they felt there wasn't any "tension" in it, and they wanted another viewpoint.

Ring of Fire began in 2004 and was syndicated by the now defunct Air America Radio until January 2010. Papantonio was also involved at Air America as a member of the Board of Directors, and as a co-contributor to the New York Times bestseller, Air America, the Playbook, a collection of essays, transcripts, and interviews by network personalities released in the run-up to the 2006 congressional elections. Papantonio has appeared regularly as a contributor on Fox News, MSNBC, and CNN.

Awards
 In 2011, Papantonio was awarded the Perry Nichols Award, the highest honor given by the Florida Justice Association. The award recognizes individuals who fight valiantly with distinction for justice throughout their lives.
 In 2014, the Stephen and Sandra Sheller Center for Social Justice of Temple University Beasley School of Law honored Papantonio for his outstanding contributions to social justice.
 In 2015, Papantonio was inducted into the Trial Lawyer Hall of Fame.
 In 2016, Levin Papantonio Rafferty won the Special Litigation (Environmental) category in the National Law Journal Elite Trial Lawyers recognition program, after Mr. Papantonio led the firm’s C8 trial team to one of several successful trials against DuPont.
 In 2019, Mr. Papantonio was awarded the Compassionate Gladiator Award from the Florida Justice Association.

References

External links

 Official biography from the Levin Papantonio website

1953 births
Living people
American talk radio hosts
University of Florida alumni
Cumberland School of Law alumni
20th-century Methodists
21st-century Methodists
American United Methodists
People from Arcadia, Florida
RT (TV network) people